Elisabeth Severance Prentiss or Mrs. Francis Fleury Prentiss (1865–1944) was an American philanthropist from Cleveland, Ohio.

Elisabeth Severance was born into a wealthy home as the daughter of the oil magnate Louis Severance and Fanny Benedict. She grew up in Cleveland and graduated at Wellesley College in 1887. She enjoyed the Boston galleries and returned to Cleveland to improve educational and arts-related institutions, joining her family in their philanthropic role as wealthy citizens of Cleveland. 

In 1892, she married the surgeon Dudley Peter Allen. Together they were interested in travel and supporting the medical community and the arts. After her father died in 1913 they used her inheritance to collect art and Dudley was on the committee to create an art museum at his alma mater Oberlin College. He died himself in 1915, and after his death Elisabeth commissioned the building from Cass Gilbert. She built a large English manor styled home commissioned from another of his architect favorites, Charles F. Schweinfurth that she named after him, "Glenallen". She also finished his work of expanding St. Luke's Hospital, which is how she met and married the president of that hospital, Dr. Francis Fleury Prentiss. The couple continued to be trustees of the hospital, and she took over his president's position when he died. She enjoyed gardening and a climbing rose was named after her in 1925. She was awarded with a public service medal by the Cleveland Chamber of Commerce in 1928.

Art collection
Her first husband was an expert in Chinese porcelain.

Her brother John Long Severance, died in 1936, leaving her as sole heir of the Severance legacy. Her brother had been a collector of tapestries and paintings. She commissioned a catalogue of his bequest.

She owned several portraits of women:

Works 
 Expansion of St. Luke's hospital
 Allen Memorial Medical Library
 Allen Memorial Art Museum
 Elisabeth Severance Prentiss Foundation
 Elisabeth Severance Prentiss Bequest, Cleveland Art Museum
 Mrs. F.F. Prentiss Fund, Allen Memorial Art Museum

She is buried in Lake View Cemetery.

References

External links

 Elisabeth Severance Allen Prentiss in the Encyclopedia of Cleveland History
 Photo portrait of Elisabeth Severance Prentiss in 1942 by Cleveland portrait photographer William John Edmondson (1868-1966)

1865 births
1944 deaths
American philanthropists
Philanthropists from Pennsylvania
Severance family